Jalalpur Jattan Tehsil is a subdivision (tehsil) of Gujrat District in the Punjab province of Pakistan. On 20 November 2016 Jalalpur Jattan was notified as Tehsil by Chief Minister of Punjab Mian Muhammad Shahbaz Shareef but proper work wasn't started. Pervaiz Elahi approved Jalalpur Jattan as Tehsil on 19 Oct 2022 and it was notified on 1st November 2022.

According to official documents, the population of the tehsil is around 343,834 according to the 1998 census. The total area of the tehsil is around 175,030 acres covering at least 325 revenue estates (villages) and 77 Patwar circles.

References

Gujrat District
Tehsils of Punjab, Pakistan